Balasaheb Ajabe is a leader of Nationalist Congress Party and a member of the Maharashtra Legislative Assembly elected from Ashti Assembly constituency in Beed city. He was Elected member of Maharashtra Legislative Assembly in 2019.

References 

Living people
Maharashtra MLAs 2019–2024
Nationalist Congress Party politicians from Maharashtra
People from Beed

Year of birth missing (living people)